Smyth is an early variant of the common surname Smith commonly found in Ireland. Shown below are notable people who share the surname "Smyth".

Notable people sharing the Smyth surname 
Listed here are people who share the 'Smyth' surname, organized by birth year.

Families 
 Smyth baronets, several independently created British hereditary titles
 Bowyer-Smyth baronets, holders of a single British hereditary title

Smyth disambiguation pages 
 John Smyth (disambiguation)
 Richard Smyth (disambiguation)
 William Smyth (disambiguation)

Notes

Other uses
 Smyth County, Virginia

References

See also
 Smith (disambiguation)
 Smythe (disambiguation)
 Smith (surname)

English-language surnames
Occupational surnames
English-language occupational surnames